The MIT Sloan Management Review is a research-based magazine and digital platform for business executives published at the Massachusetts Institute of Technology. The print edition is published quarterly; the digital edition is updated daily.

Background
The magazine (originally known as the Industrial Management Review) was established in 1959 by the MIT Sloan School of Management. In 2001, the magazine added the university (Massachusetts Institute of Technology) to its official name and the magazine has been called MIT Sloan Management Review since then. It has transformed from its original, print-only, form to a multi-format platform. The magazine distributes content on the web, in print, on mobile platforms, in podcast format, and via licensees and libraries around the world.

Sections
Content is presented in five main sections:
 Editor's Column: A one-page article from the editor-in-chief exploring a topic of current interest for business executives.
 Frontiers: Shorter articles that explore how digital technology is reshaping the practice of management.
 Special Report: Covering several articles on one specific area.
 Research Features: 3,000–5,000 word articles featuring new research and its implications for business executives.
 Executive Briefings: Synopsis and summary of articles in the publication.
 Columns: Opinion essays that appear in the back of the magazine

Culture 500
The Culture 500 is a list based on data from a partnership with Glassdoor that ranks 531 of the largest corporations operating in the United States by how favorably employees rate the corporate cultures of their employers. It analyzes 1.2 million Glassdoor employee reviews from 531 companies using natural language processing developed by CultureX that identifies culturally significant terms at 90 percent or higher accuracy; the average company in the sample has 2,182 reviews. The list measures nine cultural values: agility, collaboration, customer orientation, diversity, execution, innovation, integrity, performance, and respect.

References

External links

Business magazines published in the United States
Quarterly magazines published in the United States
Magazines established in 1959
Magazines published in Boston
Massachusetts Institute of Technology